Me and Me is a 2020 South Korean mystery drama film written and directed by Jung Jin-young (in his directorial debut), starring Cho Jin-woong, Bae Soo-bin, Jung Hae-kyun and Cha Soo-yeon.

Plot
Hyung-goo (Cho Jin-woong) is a detective. He investigates a fire accident site in a country village. The home were the fire accident took place belonged to married couple Soo-hyuk (Bae Soo-bin) and Yi-young (Cha Soo-yeon). The married couple died from suffocation. Hyung-goo senses something suspicious about village residents. One day, he wakes up in the house where the fire accident took place. He finds that his life has completely changed. The house which burned down in his memory, is standing unblemished. The village residents call him teacher instead of detective. His family, house, and job has completely disappeared.

Cast
 Cho Jin-woong as Park Hyung-goo
 Bae Soo-bin as Kim Soo-hyuk
 Jung Hae-kyun as Jung Hae-kyun
 Cha Soo-yeon as Yoon Yi-young
 Lee Sun-bin as Cho-hee
 Shin Dong-mi as Jun Ji-hyun/Mi-kyung
 Shin Kang-kyun
 Jang Won-young
 Lee Jang-won
 Noh Kang-min

Production
Principal photography began on September 30, 2018, and wrapped on November 18, 2018.

Release
The film was theatrically released on June 18, 2020.

It was screened at the 24th Fantasia International Film Festival’s signature Cheval Noir competition, earning a Special Mention for Best Actor prize, for Cho Jin-woong, as well as a Special Mention from the jury for Debut Films Competition. The film also invited to the 19th Florence Korean Film Festival and 15th Paris Korean Film Festival.

Awards and Nominations

References

External links
 
 
 
 

2020 films
2020s Korean-language films
2020s mystery films
South Korean mystery drama films